The Red River Bridge was a truss bridge crossing the Red River at Garland, Arkansas. It carried vehicular traffic from 1931 to 1990 and has since been demolished.

The southwest corner of Arkansas was cut off from the rest of the state by the Red River, which was crossed only by ferries and one railroad bridge until the twentieth century. The bridge at Garland was designed by state highway engineer Ira G. Hedrick in October 1927 and located along the old military road from El Dorado to Texarkana (later to become part of U.S. Route 82). Hedrick's design included three  through spans of Pennsylvania truss.

The winning bid for construction was submitted by the Kansas City Bridge Company, which was given the contract in September 1929. Construction activities for the bridge disturbed traffic through Garland, and this period was marked by conflict between state highway authorities and the city. (The new bridge also threatened the ferry business owned by Garland's Mayor Beasley.) The spans (though not the approaches) were complete by the morning of September 3, 1930, when two dynamite blasts threw the central span from its piers and into the river, doing $150,000 of damage. The motive was thought to be either resentment over the use of non-union labor on the bridge or an attempt to protect the local ferry business. A highway worker arrested in December and was convicted of dynamiting the bridge, but the man he accused of hiring him was acquitted, and no other persons were brought to trial for the crime. The bridge was repaired and opened, without ceremony, on July 15, 1931. Originally opened as a toll bridge, the Arkansas General Assembly made all bridges in the state free in 1938.

In later years, the bridge proved inadequate to support heavy truck traffic on U.S. Route 82. A steel support system was added to the east end in 1986, but the bridge continued to suffer from spalling concrete on the piers. The bridge was documented by the Historic American Engineering Record in 1988. A new bridge was constructed upstream to carry U.S. Route 82 so that the old bridge could be closed. It was added to the National Register of Historic Places in 1990, but was in very poor condition, and it was ultimately demolished and removed from the National Register in 1999.

See also

List of bridges documented by the Historic American Engineering Record in Arkansas
List of bridges on the National Register of Historic Places in Arkansas

References

External links

Bridges completed in 1931
Demolished bridges in the United States
Former National Register of Historic Places in Arkansas
Historic American Engineering Record in Arkansas
Transportation in Miller County, Arkansas
U.S. Route 82
Bridges of the United States Numbered Highway System
Former toll bridges in Arkansas
Red River of the South
Steel bridges in the United States
Pennsylvania truss bridges in the United States
1931 establishments in Arkansas
Demolished buildings and structures in Arkansas
1999 disestablishments in Arkansas